Disease resistance breeding is the process of selective breeding to produce or improve disease resistance. It is also used more generally for breeding for disease tolerance.

Types include:

 Plant breeding for disease resistance
 
 Other examples of Selective breeding in other organisms